Erving J. Kneen (February 24, 1867 – March 9, 1947) was a member of the Wisconsin State Assembly.

Biography
E. J. Kneen was born in Burns, Wisconsin on February 24, 1867. He attended school in Bangor.

He died at his home in La Crosse on March 9, 1947.

Career
Kneen was elected to the Assembly in 1908, and reelected in 1910. Additionally, he was President of Bangor. He was a Democrat.

References

People from Burns, Wisconsin
Democratic Party members of the Wisconsin State Assembly
1867 births
1947 deaths
People from Bangor, Wisconsin